A list of non-fiction literary works about or related to the Marvel character Spider-Man.

List

About the character

About the films

Video game manuals
 Amazing Spider-Man Gottlieb Pinball Instruction Manual (1980)
 Strategy Guide For "Spider-Man" (2000)
 Strategy Guide For "Spider-Man 2: Enter Electro" (2001)
 Strategy Guide For "Spider-Man: Mysterio's Menace" (2001)
 Strategy Guide For "Spider-Man: The Movie" (2002)

Other
 The Amazing Spider-Man (Songbook): Music from the Motion Picture Soundtrack
 The Spider-Man Villains Quiz Book (2013)

See also
 Spider-Man in literature
 Spider-Man in comics
 Spider-Man book series

References

Spider-Man
Arts bibliographies